Elizabeth Eleanor Siddall (25 July 1829 – 11 February 1862), better known as Elizabeth Siddal, was an English artist, poet, and artists' model. Significant collections of her artworks can be found at Wightwick Manor and the Ashmolean. Siddal was painted and drawn extensively by artists of the Pre-Raphaelite Brotherhood, including Walter Deverell, William Holman Hunt, John Everett Millais (including his notable 1852 painting Ophelia), and especially by her husband, Dante Gabriel Rossetti.

Early life
Elizabeth Eleanor Siddall, named after her mother, was born on 25 July 1829, at the family's home at 7 Charles Street, Hatton Garden. Her parents were Charles Crooke Siddall, and Elizabeth Eleanor Evans, from a family of English and Welsh descent. She had two older siblings, Ann and Charles Robert. At the time of her birth, her father had a cutlery-making business.

About 1831, the Siddalls moved to the less affluent borough of Southwark, in south London. The rest of Siddal's siblings were born in Southwark; Lydia, to whom she was particularly close; Mary, Clara, James and Henry. Siddal "received an ordinary education, conformable to her condition in life" and first "read Tennyson by finding one or two poems of his on a piece of paper" that had been wrapped around some butter. This engendered a love of poetry while young and inspired her to write her own.

Pre-Raphaelite Model

In 1849, while working at a millinery in Cranbourne Alley, London, Siddal made the acquaintance of Walter Deverell. Accounts differ on the circumstances of their meeting: in one account, William Allingham noticed her when he came to admire a co-worker, and then recommended her as a possible model to his friend Deverell, who was struggling with a large oil painting based on the Shakespeare play Twelfth Night. Another account has Deverell accompanying his mother to the millinery where he noticed Siddal in the back of the shop. In either case, Deverell later described Siddal as "magnificently tall, with a lovely figure, and a face of the most delicate and finished modelling ... she has grey eyes, and her hair is like dazzling copper, and shimmers with luster." Deverell subsequently employed Siddal as a model and introduced her to the Pre-Raphaelites.

As with the other Pre-Raphaelites, Deverell took his inspiration directly from life rather than from an idealized classical figure. In his Twelfth Night painting, he based Orsino on himself, Feste on his friend Dante Gabriel Rossetti and Viola/Cesario on Siddal. This was the first time Siddal sat as a model. According to William Michael Rossetti, Dante Gabriel's brother, "Deverell drew another Viola from her, in an etching for The Germ."  Elaine Shefer asserts that Deverell portrayed Siddal in A Pet and The Grey Parrot.

William Holman Hunt painted her in A Converted British Family Sheltering a Christian Missionary from the Persecution of the Druids (1849–1850) and Two Gentlemen of Verona, Valentine Rescuing Sylvia From Proteus (1850 or 1851).

For Millais's Ophelia, Siddal floated in a bathtub full of water to portray the drowning Ophelia. Millais painted daily through the winter, putting oil lamps under the tub to warm the water. On one occasion, the lamps went out and the water became icy cold. Millais, absorbed by his painting, did not notice and Siddal did not complain. After this, she became ill with a severe cold or pneumonia. Her father held Millais responsible and, under the threat of legal action, Millais paid her doctor's bills.

Relationship with Rossetti
Dante Gabriel Rossetti met Siddal in 1849, probably while they both modelled for Deverell. Rossetti gave Siddal the nickname "Lizzie" when she entered the Pre-Raphaelite Brotherhood circle, and "the diminutive enhanced her youthful, dependent role." By 1851, she had become Rossetti's muse, and he began to paint her to the exclusion of nearly all others. He also stopped Siddal from modelling for others. 

In 1852, she began to study with Rossetti. That same year, Siddal became lovers with Rossetti and moved into his Chatham Place residence. They subsequently became anti-social and absorbed in each other's affections. They coined affectionate nicknames for one another, such as "Guggums" or "Gug" and "Dove", the latter one of Rossetti's names for Siddal. He also shortened the spelling of her name to Siddal, dropping the second 'l'.

Perhaps Rossetti's most abundant and personal works were his idealized pencil sketches of Siddal at home, most of which he entitled simply "Elizabeth Siddal". In these sketches, he portrayed Siddal as a woman of leisure, class, and beauty, often situated in comfortable settings. She also became the subject of much of Rossetti's poetry. One poem, A Last Confession, extolls his love for Siddal, whom he personifies as the heroine with eyes "as of the sea and sky on a grey day."

Beginning in 1853, Rossetti used Siddal as a model for a series of Dante-themed paintings, including The First Anniversary of the Death of Beatrice (1852), Beatrice Meeting Dante at a Marriage Feast, Denies him her Salutation (1851), Dante's Vision of Rachel and Leah (1855), and, perhaps his most famous portrait of her, Beata Beatrix (1864–1870), which he painted as a memorial after her death. 

It has been estimated that there are thousands of Rossetti's drawings, paintings, and poems in which Siddal was a subject.

Work 

In 1854, Siddal painted a self-portrait that differed from the typical Pre-Raphaelite idealised beauty. In 1855, art critic John Ruskin began to subsidise her career and paid £150 per year in exchange for all the drawings and paintings she produced. She produced many sketches, drawings, and watercolours as well as one oil painting. Her sketches are similar to other Pre-Raphaelite compositions illustrating Arthurian legend and other idealized medieval themes, and she exhibited with the Pre-Raphaelites at the summer exhibition at Russell Place in 1857.

During Siddal’s career as an artist and poet from 1852 to 1861, she produced over 100 works. Siddal also wrote poetry during this period, often with dark themes about lost love or the impossibility of true love. "Her verses were as simple and moving as ancient ballads; her drawings were as genuine in their medieval spirit as much more highly finished and competent works of Pre-Raphaelite art," wrote critic William Gaunt. Both Rossetti and Ford Madox Brown supported and admired her work.

Relationship with Rossetti's family and marriage

As Siddal came from a working-class family, Rossetti feared introducing her to his parents. Siddal was the victim of harsh criticism from his sisters. The knowledge that his family would not approve contributed to Rossetti delaying the marriage. Siddal appears to have believed, with some justification, that Rossetti was always seeking to replace her with a younger muse, which contributed to her later depressive periods and illness.

Shortly before their marriage, Rossetti produced a famous portrait of Siddal, Regina Cordium or The Queen of Hearts (1860). This painting is a close-up, vibrantly coloured depiction of Siddal.

Siddal and Rossetti married on Wednesday, 23 May 1860 at St. Clement's Church in the seaside town of Hastings. There were no family or friends present, only a couple of witnesses whom they had asked in Hastings.

Ill health and death

It was thought that she suffered from tuberculosis, but some historians believe an intestinal disorder was more likely. Elbert Hubbard wrote that "She suffered much from neuralgia, and the laudanum taken to relieve the pain had grown into a necessity." Others have suggested she might have been anorexic while others attribute her poor health to a laudanum addiction or a combination of ailments.

Siddal travelled to Paris and Nice for several years for her health. At the time of her wedding, she was so frail and ill that she had to be carried to the church, despite it being a five-minute walk from where she was staying. She became severely depressed and her long illness gave her access to laudanum to which she became addicted. In 1861, Siddal became pregnant, which ended with the birth of a stillborn daughter. The stillbirth left Siddal with post-partum depression. She became pregnant for a second time in late 1861.
Siddal overdosed on laudanum on 10 February 1862. She, Rossetti, and his friend Algernon Charles Swinburne had dined together in a nearby hotel. After having taken Siddal home, Rossetti attended his weekly lecture at the Working Men's College. Upon returning home from teaching, Rossetti found Siddal unconscious in bed and could not revive her. The first doctor Rossetti called claimed that he was unable to save her, upon which Rossetti sent for another three doctors. A stomach pump was used, but to no avail. She died at 7:20 am on 11 February 1862 at their home at 14 Chatham Place. The coroner ruled her death as accidental; however, there are suggestions that Rossetti found a suicide note, with the words "Please look after Harry" (her invalid brother, who may have had a slight intellectual disability), supposedly "pinned ... on the breast of her night-shirt." Consumed with grief and guilt Rossetti allegedly went to see Ford Madox Brown who is supposed to have instructed him to burn the note. Since suicide was illegal and considered immoral, it would have brought scandal on the family and barred Siddal from a Christian burial.

After Siddal's death 

Siddal was buried with her father-in-law Gabriele on 17 February 1862 in the Rossetti family grave in the west side of Highgate Cemetery. Later burials in the same grave are her mother-in-law Frances Rossetti (1886), Christina Georgina Rossetti (1895), and William Michael Rossetti (1919).

In August 1869, Rossetti authorized Charles Howell to disinter her coffin to retrieve a handwritten book of Rossetti's poems, which he had laid beside her head before burial. With the aid of a Dr. Llewelyn Williams and two others, Howell accomplished this in October 1869. Dr. Williams subsequently disinfected the book. Rossetti then published the contents in Poems (1870). 

These became part of Rossetti's sonnet sequence entitled The House of Life. This sequence contained the poem "Without Her", a reflection on life once love has departed.

Legacy
Their home at 14 Chatham Place was demolished and is now covered by Blackfriars Station.

Exhibitions and collections

The first solo exhibition of Siddal's work was curated by Jan Marsh in 1991 at the Ruskin Gallery in Sheffield.

Rosalie Glynn Grylls and Geoffrey Mander paid a record sum for her work in the 1960s and donated the art to the National Trust. A 2018 exhibition, "Beyond Ophelia", curated by National Trust Assistant Curator Hannah Squire, ran at Wightwick Manor for nine months and featured twelve artworks by Siddal and owned by the National Trust. Only the second solo exhibition of her work, the exhibition examined Siddal's career, artistic style, subject matter, and the prejudice she faced as a female artist, whilst also exploring the Manders of Wightwick as pioneering collectors.

The oil painting Self Portrait (1853–54) and watercolour Lady Clare (1857) are currently in private collections.

Lady Affixing a Pennant to a Knight’s Spear (1856), Sir Patrick Spens (1856), and The Quest of the Holy Grail(1855) have all been exhibited in the Tate Gallery in London.

The finished drawings The Lady of Shalott and Pippa Passes (1854) are respectively displayed in the J.S. Maas Collection and the Ashmolean Museum in Oxford.

Siddal’s paintings also include Clerk Saunders (1857), The Haunted Wood, and Madonna and Child with an Angel (c. 1856).

Works inspired by Siddal

Literature

In the literature and memoirs during the 1880s and 90s, Elizabeth Siddal was depicted as "a fantasy sex" object in a manner of curious cult. Her admirers include the poet Swinburne and Oscar Wilde. The artist and aesthete Charles Ricketts confessed that "Oh, we have all, when young, been in love with Miss Siddal." While in the 1920s and 30s, because of the prevalent paradigms of contemporary psychology and "sexology", the picture of Siddal in fiction and poems began to change by this re-establishment of sexuality environment. She was thus regarded as "a morbid, hysterical, suicidal woman clinging to her virginity and angrily jealous of her rivals."

Mollie Hardwick (author of Upstairs, Downstairs) wrote a mystery novel entitled The Dreaming Damozel in 1990. The plot follows antique dealer Doran Fairweather, who is elated to find a small oil painting she believes to be of Elizabeth Siddal but is shocked when she happens on the body of a girl, floating dead in a pond. The death scene mimics the Millais painting of Ophelia featuring Elizabeth Siddal. Doran' excited by the coincidence and mystery, ignores the advice of her husband who warns her the story of Rossetti and Siddal was plagued by unhappiness.

Elizabeth Siddal, Dante Gabriel Rossetti, and Algernon Charles Swinburne are the subjects of the short comics story How They Met Themselves, part of The Sandman series by Neil Gaiman, drawn by Michael Zulli, and published in Vertigo: Winter's Edge #3 (2000). In it, a dying Lizzie drugged with laudanum revives the last New Year's Day, in which the trio had a train trip to a magic forest owned by Desire. The title makes reference to the Rossetti's 1864 doppelgänger painting, How They Met Themselves.

Fiona Mountain's 2002 mystery novel, Pale as the Dead centres on a "genealogical mystery" around the fictional descendants of Elizabeth Siddal and Dante Gabriel Rossetti.

Sleep, Pale Sister, a 2004 Gothic novel set in the Victorian art world by the author Joanne Harris, draws heavily on the character of Siddal and her relationship with Rossetti.

In Tim Powers' 2012 novel Hide Me Among the Graves, Siddal is a victim of the vampire John Polidori, her husband's uncle and author of what is likely the first vampire story. This becomes an explanation for her illness and death, as well as for her husband's exhumation of her grave, which is not to regain his poems but is part of a strategy to defeat the vampire.

Ophelia's Muse is a 2015 historical novel by Rita Cameron. It tells the story of Siddal and the Pre-Raphelites.

Lizzie Siddal, a play written by Jeremy Green, was performed at the Arcola Theatre, London in 2013.

Television

Art

Holly Trostle Brigham has created works portraying and inspired by Siddal, exhibited in 2022 at the Delaware Art Museum, which also has a substantial Pre-Raphaellite collection.

Gallery

Works by Siddal

Works with Siddal as a model

Bibliography

See also
List of paintings by Dante Gabriel Rossetti

Notes

References

Sources

Further reading

External links

 Selected Poetry of Elizabeth Siddal
 Beyond Ophelia Exhibition, Wightwick Manor, Wolverhampton
 Birmingham Museums & Art Gallery's Pre-Raphaelite Online Resource  includes many portraits of Elizabeth Siddal by Rossetti
 Portraits of Elizabeth Siddal from major Rossetti exhibition
 Letters written by Elizabeth Siddal
 Photographs of Elizabeth Siddal's grave
 

1829 births
1862 deaths
19th-century British painters
19th-century British women artists
19th-century British writers
19th-century English women writers
Accidental deaths in England
British women painters
Burials at Highgate Cemetery
Drug-related deaths in England
English artists' models
English women poets
Muses
Painters from London
People from Holborn
Polidori-Rossetti family
Pre-Raphaelite Brotherhood artists' models
Pre-Raphaelite Brotherhood
Pre-Raphaelite painters
Victorian poets
Women of the Victorian era
Female Pre-Raphaelite painters